Connal McInerney (born 2 March 1995) is an Australian rugby union player who plays for the  in the Super Rugby competition and Australia internationally. His position of choice is hooker.

International career 
McInerney was first called up to the Wallabies squad in 2020, but was not named in any match-day team selections. After another successful Super Rugby season, McInerney was again called up to the cover squad. He was not selected for any matches during the 2021 France tour of Australia or 2021 Rugby Championship, but finally made his test match debut against  on the 2021 end-of-year tour, coming off the bench in a 32–23 win and scoring his maiden try in the final minutes.

References 

Rugby union hookers
1995 births
Living people
Australian rugby union players
Australia international rugby union players
ACT Brumbies players
Canberra Vikings players
New South Wales Country Eagles players